Home Country Direct is a telecommunications service to facilitate calling one's home country while traveling abroad. It made it possible to speak with an operator familiar with the language of the traveler. The Home Country Direct number is usually a domestic toll-free number, and is specific to the pairing of originating and receiving countries.

The first such services were established in the early 1980s by AT&T as "USA Direct"; reciprocal services from the United States were later established, and other countries also established the services, such as Canada Direct established by the former Telecom Canada alliance.

As the services long predated international freephone service +800, it was required to establish a toll-free number in each country that conformed to that country's method of establishing such a service.  Since many countries had not yet migrated their freephone services to the better known 800 area code, it made for a variety of different numbers, including short dialing codes.  The service might also be limited to payphones, and might require pre-pay using coins or a card.  Once the number was dialed, the call was routed through the international switch, over overseas circuits, directly to an operator in the country being called.

Sometimes, at a premium rate, one could call a third country instead of the home country.

Before home country direct services were established, callers trying to call home were limited in their ability to make a call.  While a few countries allowed reciprocal collect calls, most only allowed such calls to Canada or the United States, often at person-to-person rates, and even fewer nations permitted calls using a foreign telephone calling card.  Many countries did not permit charge transfers at all, forcing the caller to pay directly to the service provider at the point the call originated.

See also
 Collect call
 Universal International Freephone Service

References

Special international telephone services